Dan Cunneen (aka Dan Steely) is an American musician, songwriter, disc jockey, screen printer and graphic designer originally from Portland, Oregon, United States. Cunneen is best known for his drum work with the 1980s Portland, Oregon bands Final Warning and The Obituaries as well as the 1990s Seattle, Washington-based bands Zipgun and Nightcaps. In 2020, Cunneen began recording under the moniker Dan Steely. Cunneen also occasionally plays drums with the Perkins Coie Band (aka PCBs), the in house band for the Seattle, Washington-based law firm Perkins Coie.

On January 3, 2015, Cunneen was ordained as a minister in the Universal Life Church.

Musician
Cunneen formed his first band, Final Warning, in 1982 with Jeff “Simon” Simoncini, bassist Tim Paul and vocalist Jeff Paul. Final Warning were notable for their anti-war political themes and as one of the early hardcore bands to incorporate heavy metal into their sound.
  
After Final Warning broke up in 1987, Cunneen played drums with Portland-based folk-rock singer songwriter Lew Jones.

In 1987 Cunneen was recruited to play drums for the Portland-based punk, rock, and blues band, The Obituaries. Along with bands like Napalm Beach, Dead Moon, and Poison Idea, The Obituaries were one of the notable bands in the Portland underground club scene in the late 1980s. Cunneen played drums and co-wrote one song on The Obituaries EP, but would leave the band mid-tour in 1989.

After relocating to Seattle in 1991, Cunneen formed the punk band Zipgun with guitarist Neil Rogers, singer Robb Clarke and bassist Mark Wooten. Zipgun released three singles and two full-length albums on Pacific Northwest independent record label Empty Records and several singles on various labels. Zipgun toured extensively throughout the United States and Canada and appeared in the Doug Pray film Hype! a documentary chronicling the 1990s Seattle Grunge music scene.

After Zipgun’s demise in 1995, Cunneen formed and led the Seattle-based lounge band, Nightcaps with vocalist Theresa Hannam, guitarist Garth Brandenburg and bassist William Herzog. Nightcaps were an integral part of the mid 1990s Lounge music resurgence that included bands such as Combustible Edison, Squirrel Nut Zippers and Love Jones. The Nightcaps were known as one of the few renascent lounge bands to avoid irony and kitsch.

In 2011, Rendezvous Recordings released Cunneen's The Answer b/w Shoot & Share solo 7-inch single. Cunneen described the two songs as "Black comedy metal, combining lyrical irony with metallic garage-punk musical sensibilities."

In 2020, under the moniker Dan Steely, Cunneen released a single and music video of the Electric Light Orchestra song "Showdown." The 7 inch single's B-side features a remix of the A-side, "Showdown (DJ Yot Roc Mix)" in the yacht rock style.

Disc jockey
In 1994, using the moniker "DJ DiamonDan," Cunneen began what would become a two-year DJ residency at Linda's Tavern in Seattle. Throughout the 1990s and 2000s Cunneen performed at private parties and Seattle venues such as Re-bar, The Baltic Room, Moore Theater and The Capitol Club. Cunneen continues to occasionally disc jockey at clubs and private events using the name "DJ Dan Steely."

Graphic design
Cunneen was art director and designer for many of the commercial releases and promotional material for the bands he played in. In 2016, Cunneen founded the Seattle-based company ORANJ Screen Printing & Graphic Design.

Discography
with Final Warning
 1983 Rain of Death cassette demo
 1984 Final Warning (EP) Fatal Erection Records
 1985 Drinking is Great (EP) (track on compilation: "I Quit") Fatal Erection Records
 2007 PDX (CD) Southern Lord Records
 2008 Final Warning EP (reissue) Black Water Records
 2015 Demonstration 1983 (7-inch EP) Black Water Records

with Lew Jones
 1994 Lew Jones Anthology 1978–1994: Take Me to the Future (CD) (played drums on several tracks)  New Weave Records

with Obituaries
 1988 Obituaries (EP) Highgate Records
 2007 The Obituaries (anthology CD) (played drums on several tracks) Highgate Records

with Zipgun
 1991 Together Dumb/Cool in the Cell (single) Empty Records
 1991 Ten (one sided promo single) Empty Records
 1992 8 Track Player (CD/LP) Empty Records
 1992 The End/Nothing Cures (single) Musical Tragedies
 1993 Put Me Away (split single w/ Derelicts) Rekkids
 1993 Baltimore (CD/LP) Empty Records
 1994 I Can't Wait/Tight Black Pants (single) Thrill Jockey Records

with Nightcaps
 1995 Gambler's Game/For Me (single) Rendezvous Recordings
 1995 I Don't Like You/Love You More (single) Sup Pop
 1996 Split (CD) Rendezvous Recordings/Sub Pop
 1998 You Lied/Last of the Secret Agents (single) Estrus Records
 2000 Get On (CD) Rendezvous Recordings
 2002 Spin Out 3 (compilation CD track: "Love You More") V2 Records (Japan)
 2003 I Don't Like You (CD) User Records (Japan)
 2011 In the Live Room (+ the singles) (CD) Rendezvous Recordings

Dan Cunneen
 2011 The Answer b/w Shoot & Share (single) Rendezvous Recordings

Dan Steely
 2020 Showdown b/w Showdown (DJ Yot Roc Mix) (vinyl/digital single) ORANJ Recordings

References

External links
ORANJ Screen Printing & Graphic Design website
Dan Cunneen website
Dan Cunneen Graphic Design Portfolio
2008 Portland Mercury interview with Dan Cunneen
Feature on the Final Warning reunion in Willamette Week
Seattle Times feature on the PCBs
Final Warning website

1963 births
Living people
Musicians from Oregon
Musicians from Washington (state)
American punk rock musicians
American punk rock drummers
American male drummers
20th-century American drummers
20th-century American male musicians